Le Roi des resquilleurs is a French film directed by Pierre Colombier, released in 1930. It was distributed in the US as The King of the Gate Crashers.

Details
 Title : Le Roi des resquilleurs
 Rirector: Pierre Colombier
 Writer: Pierre Colombier and René Pujol
 Dialogue: René Pujol
 Decoration: Jacques Colombier
 Image: Henri Barreyre and Fédote Bourgassoff
 Sound: Carl S. Livermann
 Music: Ralph Erwin and Kazimierz Oberfeld
 Producer: Bernard Natan, Émile Natan
 Production company: Pathé-Natan
 Release date: France: 14 November 1930

Starring
 Georges Milton : Eugène "Bouboule" Leroy
 Hélène Perdrière : Lulu
 Hélène Robert : Arlette
 Pierre Nay : René Francis
 Henri Kerny : The controller
 Mady Berry : Mme Francis
 Jean Garat : Sycleton
 Jean Bérétrot : The speaker
 Jim Prat : The judge
 Léon Bernstein : The referee
 Georgette Anys
 Louise Dauville
 Henri Desmarets : The director of the Vel' d'Hiv'
 Henri Farty
 Laure Jarny
 Nicolas Redelsperger : the selector

The film
The film is the first of a series of films containing the character of "Bouboule", created by the singer Milton and comprising La Bande à Bouboule (1931), directed by Léon Mathot, Le Roi du cirage (1931), directed by Pierre Colombier, Bouboule Ier, roi des Nègres (1933), directed by Léon Mathot, and Prince Bouboule, directed by Jacques Houssin (1939).

Remake
A remake was released in 1945, starring Jean Devaivre and Rellys.

It was one of the most popular movies in France in 1945 with admissions of 3,679,438.

Notes and references

External links

1945 remake at IMDb

1930 films
French black-and-white films
French comedy films
1930 comedy films
1930s French films